Robert Tyler (born October 12, 1965) is a former American football tight end in the National Football League (NFL) who played for the Seattle Seahawks. He played college football at South Carolina State University.

References 

1965 births
Living people
Players of American football from Savannah, Georgia
American football tight ends
South Carolina State Bulldogs football players
Seattle Seahawks players